AS Saint-Etienne won Division 1 season 1966/1967 of the French Association Football League with 54 points.

Participating teams

 Angers SCO
 Bordeaux
 RC Lens
 Lille OSC
 Olympique Lyonnais
 Olympique de Marseille
 AS Monaco
 FC Nantes
 OGC Nice
 Nîmes Olympique
 Stade de Reims
 Stade Rennais UC
 FC Rouen
 AS Saint-Etienne
 RC Paris-Sedan
 FC Sochaux-Montbéliard
 Stade de Paris FC
 RC Strasbourg
 Toulouse FC (1937)
 US Valenciennes-Anzin

League table

Promoted from Division 2, who will play in Division 1 season 1967/1968
 AC Ajaccio: Champion of Division 2
 FC Metz: runner-up of Division 2
 AS Aixoise: 4th place, SEC Bastia (3rd) stay in Division 2

Merger at the end of the season
 Toulouse FC (1937) with Red Star Olympique, become Red Star FC

Results

Top goalscorers

References
 Division 1 season 1966-1967 at pari-et-gagne.com

Ligue 1 seasons
French
1